HMS Deal Castle was a member of the standardize 20-gun sixth rates built at the end of the 17th Century. After she was commissioned she was in Newfoundland, The West Indies, Irish Sea Jamaica and back to Home Waters. She was captured by the French in 1706.

Deal Castle was the first ship in the Royal Navy.

Construction
She was ordered in the Fourth Batch of four ships from Deptford Dockyard to be built under the guidance of their Master Shipwright, Fisher Harding. She was launched on 6 November 1697.

Commissioned Service
She was commissioned on 28 October 1697 under the command of Captain Henry Fowles, RN. In 1698 Captain Sir Thomas Hardy took command. Captain Fowles re-assumed command in 1699 and sailed for Newfoundland. In 1700, Captain Edmund Doyley, RN assumed command and sailed to North America and the West Indies in 1700 and 1701. In 1702 she was surveying the Irish Coast. Following Captain Doyley's death on 10 May 1703, Commander Henry Scott, RN assumed command for service in the North Sea. In 1704 Commander John Trehearne, RN took command and proceeded to Jamaica, where he died in 1705. In 1706 Commander Chaloner Ogle, RN took command.

Loss
She was taken by a French 26-gun privateer off Ostend on 3 July 1706.

Citations

References
 Winfield, British Warships in the Age of Sail (1603 – 1714), by Rif Winfield, published by Seaforth Publishing, England © 2009, EPUB , Chapter 6, The Sixth Rates, Vessels acquired from 18 December 1688, Sixth Rates of 20 guns and up to 26 guns, Maidstone Group, Deal Castle
 Colledge, Ships of the Royal Navy, by J.J. Colledge, revised and updated by Lt Cdr Ben Warlow and Steve Bush, published by Seaforth Publishing, Barnsley, Great Britain, © 2020, e  (EPUB), Section D (Deal Castle)

 

1690s ships
Corvettes of the Royal Navy
Ships built in Deptford
Naval ships of the United Kingdom